Mountain Air (German: Höhenluft) is a 1917 German silent comedy film directed by Rudolf Biebrach and starring Henny Porten, Paul Hartmann, and Reinhold Schünzel.

The film's sets were designed by the art director Ludwig Kainer.

Cast
 Henny Porten as Fürstin von Solmsdorf 
 Paul Hartmann as Egon 
 Reinhold Schünzel as Von Storch
 Lupu Pick as Von Melbitz 
 Max Laurence as Herzog von Isenburg 
 Emmy Wyda as Von Briesen 
 Rudolf Biebrach as Lämmermeier

References

Bibliography
 Bock, Hans-Michael & Bergfelder, Tim. The Concise CineGraph. Encyclopedia of German Cinema. Berghahn Books, 2009.

External links

1917 films
Films of the German Empire
German silent feature films
Films directed by Rudolf Biebrach
German black-and-white films
1917 comedy films
German comedy films
Films set in the Alps
Silent comedy films
1910s German films